Ladies, Women and Girls is a studio album released by Bratmobile in 2000, after a six-year hiatus.

Critical reception
After their years-long separation, Bratmobile returned to the punk rock scene with a new album that was welcomed in Rolling Stone for showing that "the Brat spirit was fully intact". Other writers noted the positive influence of the band's maturation: rock journalist Maria Raha wrote that the album represents "evidence of the band's evolution from both a musical and an ideological standpoint". In Trouser Press, Ira Robbins praised the new material for proving "Bratmobile's ability to transcend amateurishness without abandoning the unfettered emotional freedom that came with it."

Track listing
"Eating Toothpaste"  – 2:26  	   	
"Gimme Brains"  – 2:16 		
"It's Common (But We Don't Talk About It)"  – 2:16 		
"Not in Dog Years"  – 1:53 		
"You're Fired"  – 2:51 		
"Cheap Trick Record"  – 1:40 		
"In Love with All My Lovers"  – 2:06 		
"90's Nomad"  – 2:10 		
"Well You Wanna Know What?"  – 3:26 		
"Flavor of the Month Club"  – 2:35 		
"Affection Training"  – 1:56 		
"Do You Like Me Like That?"  – 2:37 		
"Come Hither"  – 2:28 		
"Girlfriends Don't Keep"  – 1:15

Personnel
Bratmobile
Molly Neuman – Drums
Erin Smith – Guitar
Allison Wolfe – Vocals
Additional credits
Mary Manning – Cover photo
Jon Nikki – Bass, keyboards
Pat Graham – Photography

References

2000 albums
Bratmobile albums
Lookout! Records albums